John Mahaffy (July 18, 1918 – May 2, 2015) was a Canadian professional ice hockey centre who played 37 games in the National Hockey League. Born in Montreal, Quebec, he played for the New York Rangers and Montreal Canadiens. He married Angie Péloquin around 1961. He died in May 2015 at the age of 96.

References

External links 

1918 births
2015 deaths
Buffalo Bisons (AHL) players
Canadian ice hockey centres
Hershey Bears players
Ice hockey people from Montreal
Montreal Canadiens players
New York Rangers players
Philadelphia Rockets players
Pittsburgh Hornets players
Canadian expatriate ice hockey players in the United States